Peter Woolley (born July 12, 1929) was a Canadian football player who played for the Hamilton Tiger-Cats. He won the Grey Cup with them in 1953.

References

Hamilton Tiger-Cats players
Living people
Players of Canadian football from Ontario
Sportspeople from Hamilton, Ontario
1929 births